Summertime is a drama short (runtime of 26 minutes) written by Michael Ennis, directed by Eve Morrison, produced by Hilary McLoughlin and Storm Productions, and jointly financed by RTÉ and the Irish Film Board. It was made in 1995 and broadcast by RTÉ on 13 January 1997.

Two outsiders, Andrew, an 18-year old who is gay and being bullied by classmates, and Victoria, who has recently arrived from London, form a strong friendship in secondary school that helps them both to come to terms with their 'otherness.'

The short was filmed in Ireland.

Main cast
Stuart Townsend - Andrew
Jason O'Mara - Father Pat
Natalie Stringer - Victoria
Les Martin - Richard O'Malley

External links

 Summertime w/Jason O'Mara

Irish drama television series